Diadegma armillatum is a wasp first described by Johann Ludwig Christian Gravenhorst in 1829. The species is native to Sweden.

Subspecies 
The species is divided into the following subspecies:

 D. a turcicum
 D. a aegyptiator
 D. a rufum

References

armillatum
Insects described in 1829
Taxa named by Johann Ludwig Christian Gravenhorst